Safehull is a software package developed by the ABS in September 1993. It enables the design and evaluation of ship structures, thanks to finite element analysis tools. Possible analyses include:
 Dynamic load determination
 Fatigue analysis

Users
This software is used by Harland and Wolff Heavy Industries and Viking Systems (a ship structural design company), among others.

External links
 ABS Homepage
 ABS SafeHull Technical Information
 Harland and Wolff Engineering Design Resources
 Viking Systems

References

Finite element software